In mathematics, a stochastic matrix is a square matrix used to describe the transitions of a Markov chain.  Each of its entries is a nonnegative real number representing a probability.   It is also called a probability matrix, transition matrix, substitution matrix, or Markov matrix. The stochastic matrix was first developed by Andrey Markov at the beginning of the 20th century, and has found use throughout a wide variety of scientific fields, including probability theory, statistics, mathematical finance and linear algebra, as well as computer science and population genetics. There are several different definitions and types of stochastic matrices: 

A right stochastic matrix is a real square matrix, with each row summing to 1.
A left stochastic matrix is a real square matrix, with each column summing to 1.
A doubly stochastic matrix is a square matrix of nonnegative real numbers with each row and column summing to 1.

In the same vein, one may define a stochastic vector (also called probability vector) as a vector whose elements are nonnegative real numbers which sum to 1. Thus, each row of a right stochastic matrix (or column of a left stochastic matrix) is a stochastic vector. A common convention in English language mathematics literature is to use row vectors of probabilities and right stochastic matrices rather than column vectors of probabilities and left stochastic matrices; this article follows that convention. In addition, a substochastic matrix is a real square matrix whose row sums are all

History 

The stochastic matrix was developed alongside the Markov chain by Andrey Markov, a Russian mathematician and professor at St. Petersburg University who first published on the topic in 1906. His initial intended uses were for linguistic analysis and other mathematical subjects like card shuffling, but both Markov chains and matrices rapidly found use in other fields.

Stochastic matrices were further developed by scholars like Andrey Kolmogorov, who expanded their possibilities by allowing for continuous-time Markov processes. By the 1950s, articles using stochastic matrices had appeared in the fields of econometrics and circuit theory. In the 1960s, stochastic matrices appeared in an even wider variety of scientific works, from behavioral science to geology to residential planning. In addition, much mathematical work was also done through these decades to improve the range of uses and functionality of the stochastic matrix and Markovian processes more generally.

From the 1970s to present, stochastic matrices have found use in almost every field that requires formal analysis, from structural science to medical diagnosis to personnel management. In addition, stochastic matrices have found wide use in land change modeling, usually under the term Markov matrix.

Definition and properties
A stochastic matrix describes a Markov chain  over a finite state space  with cardinality .

Since the total of transition probability from a state  to all other states must be 1,

thus this matrix is a right stochastic matrix.  

In general, the -th power  of a right stochastic matrix  is also right stochastic.

An initial probability distribution of states, specifying where the system might be initially and with what probabilities, is given as a row vector.

A stationary probability vector  is defined as a distribution, written as a row vector, that does not change under application of the transition matrix; that is, it is defined as a probability distribution on the set  which is also a row eigenvector of the probability matrix, associated with eigenvalue 1:

It can be shown that the spectral radius of any stochastic matrix is one. By the Gershgorin circle theorem, all of the eigenvalues of a stochastic matrix have absolute values less than or equal to one. Additionally, every right stochastic matrix has an "obvious" column eigenvector associated to the eigenvalue 1: the vector , whose coordinates are all equal to 1 (just observe that multiplying a row of  times  equals the sum of the entries of the row and, hence, it equals 1). As left and right eigenvalues of a square matrix are the same, every stochastic matrix has, at least, a row eigenvector associated to the eigenvalue 1 and the largest absolute value of all its eigenvalues is also 1. Finally, the Brouwer Fixed Point Theorem (applied to the compact convex set of all probability distributions of the finite set ) implies that there is some left eigenvector which is also a stationary probability vector.

On the other hand, the Perron–Frobenius theorem also ensures that every irreducible stochastic matrix has such a stationary vector, and that the largest absolute value of an eigenvalue is always 1. However, this theorem cannot be applied directly to such matrices because they need not be irreducible.

In general, there may be several such vectors.  However, for a matrix with strictly positive entries (or, more generally, for an irreducible aperiodic stochastic matrix), this vector is unique and can be computed by observing that for any  we have the following limit,

where  is the -th element of the row vector . Among other things, this says that the long-term probability of being in a state  is independent of the initial state . That both of these computations give the same stationary vector is a form of an ergodic theorem, which is generally true in a wide variety of dissipative dynamical systems: the system evolves, over time, to a stationary state.

Intuitively, a stochastic matrix represents a Markov chain; the application of the stochastic matrix to a probability distribution redistributes the probability mass of the original distribution while preserving its total mass. If this process is applied repeatedly, the distribution converges to a stationary distribution for the Markov chain.

Example: the cat and mouse 

Suppose there is a timer and a row of five adjacent boxes. At time zero, a cat is in the first box, and a mouse is in the fifth box. The cat and the mouse both jump to a random adjacent box when the timer advances. E.g. if the cat is in the second box and the mouse is in the fourth, the probability that the cat will be in the first box and the mouse in the fifth after the timer advances is one fourth. If the cat is in the first box and the mouse is in the fifth, the probability that the cat will be in box two and the mouse will be in box four after the timer advances is one. The cat eats the mouse if both end up in the same box, at which time the game ends. Let the random variable K be the time the mouse stays in the game.

The Markov chain that represents this game contains the following five states specified by the combination of positions (cat,mouse).  Note that while a naive enumeration of states would list 25 states, many are impossible either because the mouse can never have a lower index than the cat (as that would mean the mouse occupied the cat's box and survived to move past it), or because the sum of the two indices will always have even parity.  In addition, the 3 possible states that lead to the mouse's death are combined into one:

 State 1: (1,3)
 State 2: (1,5)
 State 3: (2,4)
 State 4: (3,5)
 State 5: game over: (2,2), (3,3) & (4,4).

We use a stochastic matrix,  (below), to represent the transition probabilities of this system (rows and columns in this matrix are indexed by the possible states listed above, with the pre-transition state as the row and post-transition state as the column).   For instance, starting from state 1 – 1st row – it is impossible for the system to stay in this state, so ; the system also cannot transition to state 2 – because the cat would have stayed in the same box – so , and by a similar argument for the mouse, . Transitions to states 3 or 5 are allowed, and thus  .

Long-term averages

No matter what the initial state, the cat will eventually catch the mouse (with probability 1) and a stationary state π = (0,0,0,0,1) is approached as a limit. The states with  do not contribute to the long-term average.

Phase-type representation

As State 5 is an absorbing state, the distribution of time to absorption is discrete phase-type distributed. Suppose the system starts in state 2, represented by the vector . The states where the mouse has perished don't contribute to the survival average so state five can be ignored. The initial state and transition matrix can be reduced to,

 

and 

where  is the identity matrix, and  represents a column matrix of all ones that acts as a sum over states.

Since each state is occupied for one step of time the expected time of the mouse's survival is just the sum of the probability of occupation over all surviving states and steps in time,

Higher order moments are given by

See also 
 Density matrix
 Markov kernel, the equivalent of a stochastic matrix over a continuous state space
 Matrix difference equation
 Models of DNA evolution
 Muirhead's inequality
 Probabilistic automaton
 Transition rate matrix, used to generalize the stochastic matrix to continuous time

References

zh-yue:轉移矩陣
Matrices
Markov models